Musa exotica is a species of wild banana (genus Musa), native to Vietnam. It is placed in section Callimusa (now including the former section Australimusa), having a diploid chromosome number of 2n = 20. It was only described in 2004, from a collection in the Cúc Phương Forest Reservation, Ninh Bình Province, Vietnam. The clear orange bud is upright; small yellow bananas develop below the male flowers.

References

exotica
Plants described in 2004
Endemic flora of Vietnam